Manaung is a town in Rakhine State, Myanmar (Burma) on Cheduba Island.
It lies on the left bank of a river in the north-east of the island. The town is served by Manaung Airport.

Climate

References

External links
manaung.com
Maplandia.com

Township capitals of Myanmar
Populated places in Rakhine State